Li Yang is a Chinese amateur boxer best known for winning a bronze medal at featherweight at the 2007 World Amateur Boxing Championships in Chicago.

He lost in the semifinal to Vasyl Lomachenko +13:13 (countback).

World Amateur Championships 
2005 (as a bantamweight)
Defeated Fong Vou Wai (Hong Kong) 22-2
Defeated Sodgerel Battur (Mongolia) 23-8
Lost to Alexey Shaydulin (Bulgaria) walk-over

2007 (as a featherweight)
Defeated Tomas Vano (Slovakia) RSCO 3
Defeated Koba Pchakadze (Georgia) 15-2
Defeated Carlos Zambrano (Peru) 13-4
Defeated Anthresh Lalit Lakra (India) 17-6
Lost to Vasyl Lomachenko (Ukraine) 13-13

Olympic Games 
2008 (as a featherweight)
Defeated Robson Conceiçao (Brazil) 12-4
Defeated Luis Porozo (Ecuador) 6-5
Lost to Vasyl Lomachenko (Ukraine) 3-12

External links
 Chicago
 sports-reference

1982 births
Living people
Boxers at the 2008 Summer Olympics
Featherweight boxers
Olympic boxers of China
Sportspeople from Xuzhou
Chinese male boxers
AIBA World Boxing Championships medalists
21st-century Chinese people